was a feudal domain under the Tokugawa shogunate of Edo period Japan, located in Tajima Province in what is now the northern portion of modern-day Hyōgo Prefecture. It was centered initially around Izushi Castle in what is now the Izushi neighborhood of the city of Toyooka, Hyōgo.

History
From the Muromachi period, Tajima Province had been under the control of the Yamana clan. However, in the Sengoku period, the area was conquered by Oda Nobunaga. During the Battle of Sekigahara, Koide Yoshimasa and his father Koide Hidemasa attacked Tanabe Castle which was under the control Hosokawa Fujitaka during the Siege of Tanabe. Despite being on the losing side of the war, Tokugawa Ieyasu forgave the Koide clan as Hidemasa's second son, Koide Hideie, served in the Eastern Army with a force of 300 cavalrymen at his father's behest, and distinguished himself greatly against the Uesugi clan and at the Battle Sekigahara. Koide Hidemasa was made daimyō of Kishiwada Domain with a kokudaka of 30,000 koku and Koide Yoshimasa was given Izushi Domain with a kokudaka of 60,000 koku. On Hidemasa's death in 1604, Yoshimasa was transferred to Kishiwada, which was increased to 50,000 koku, and  Izushi went to his son, Koide Yoshifusa. However, Yoshifusa's younger brother and heir, Koide Yoshichika was transferred to Sonobe Domain in Tanba Province, and Yoshifusa returned to Izushi in 1619, which was reduced to 50,000 koku to match his former holdings in Kishiwada. The Koide clan continued to rule Izushi until the 9th daimyō, Koide Yoshitsugu, who died at the age of one in 1696. 

The Koide were replaced by Matsudaira Tadachika of the Fujii-Matsudaira clan, formerly of Iwatsuki Domain. He was reassigned to Ueda Domain in 1706, and Sengoku Masaakira came from Ueda to Izushi in exchange. The Sengoku clan would continue to rule Izushi until the Meiji restoration. Under the 7th daimyō, Sengoku Hisatoshi, the domain was beset by peasant's revolts on two occasions. The first revolt, in 1835, was serious enough to warrant direct intervention by the shogunate, and resulted in the domain being punished by a reduction in its kokudaka from 58,000 to 30,000 koku. The domain sat out the Boshin War without incident. In 1871, with the abolition of the han system, Izushi Domain became "Izushi Prefecture". and subsequently became part of Hyogo Prefecture. The Sengoku clan was later ennobled with the kazoku peerage title of shishaku (viscount), and the final daimyō, Sengoku Masakata went on to serve in the House of Peers from 1890 to his death in 1917.

Holdings at the end of the Edo period
Unlike most domains in the han system, which consisted of several discontinuous territories calculated to provide the assigned kokudaka, based on periodic cadastral surveys and projected agricultural yields, Toyooka Domain was a single unified holding. 

Tajima Province 
9 villages in Yabu District
5 villages in Keta District
27 villages in Mikumi District
76 villages in Izushi District

List of daimyō 

{| class=wikitable
! #||Name || Tenure || Courtesy title || Court Rank || kokudaka 
|-
|colspan=6|  Koide clan, 1600-1696 (Tozama)
|-
||1||||1600 - 1604||Shinano-no-kami (信濃守)|| Junior 4th Rank, Lower Grade (従四位下)||60,000 koku
|-
||2||||1604 - 1613||Yamato-no-kami (大和守)|| Junior 5th Rank, Lower Grade (従五位下)||60,000 koku
|-
||3||||1613 - 1619||Shinano-no-kami (信濃守)|| Junior 4th Rank, Lower Grade (従四位下)||60,000 koku
|-
||4||||1619 - 1666||Yamato-no-kami (大和守)|| Junior 5th Rank, Lower Grade (従五位下)||60,000 ->50,000  koku
|-
||5||||1666 - 1673||Shuri-no-suke (修理亮)|| Junior 5th Rank, Lower Grade (従五位下)||50,000 koku
|-
||6||||1673 - 1691||Bizen-no-kami (備前守)|| Junior 5th Rank, Lower Grade (従五位下)||50,000 koku
|-
||7||||1692||Yamato-no-kami (大和守)|| Junior 5th Rank, Lower Grade (従五位下)||50,000  koku
|-
||8||||1692 - 1694|||Yamato-no-kami (大和守)|| Junior 5th Rank, Lower Grade (従五位下)||50,000 koku
|-
||9||||1695 - 1696|| -none-|| -none- ||50,000 koku
|-
|colspan=6|  Fujii-Matsudaira clan, 1697-1706 (Fudai)
|-
||1||||1697 - 1706||Iga-no-kami (伊賀守); Jijū (侍従)|| Junior 4th Rank, Lower Grade (従四位下)||48,000 koku
|-
|colspan=6|  Sengoku clan, 1706-1871 (Tozama)
|-
||1||||1706 - 1717||Echizen-no-kami (越前守)|| Junior 5th Rank, Lower Grade (従五位下)||58,000 koku
|-
||2||||1717 - 1735||Shinano-no-kami (信濃守)|| Junior 5th Rank, Lower Grade (従五位下)||58,000 koku
|-
||3||||1735 - 1779||Echizen-no-kami (越前守)|| Junior 5th Rank, Lower Grade (従五位下)||58,000 koku
|-
||4||||1779 - 1785||Gyobu-shoyu (刑部少輔)|| Junior 5th Rank, Lower Grade (従五位下)||58,000 koku 
|-
||5||||1785 - 1814||Echizen-no-kami (越前守)|| Junior 5th Rank, Lower Grade (従五位下)||58,000 koku
|-
||6||||1814 - 1824||Echizen-no-kami (越前守)|| Junior 5th Rank, Lower Grade (従五位下)||58,000 koku
|-
|7||||1824 - 1870||Echizen-no-kami (越前守)|| Junior 5th Rank, Lower Grade (従五位下)||58,000 -> 30,000 koku
|-
||8||||1870 - 1871||Echizen-no-kami (越前守)|| Junior 5th Rank, Lower Grade (従五位下)||30,000 koku
|-
|}

See also 
 List of Han
 Abolition of the han system

Further reading
 Bolitho, Harold. (1974). Treasures Among Men: The Fudai Daimyo in Tokugawa Japan. New Haven: Yale University Press.  ;  OCLC 185685588

References

Domains of Japan
1600 establishments in Japan
States and territories established in 1600
1871 disestablishments in Japan
States and territories disestablished in 1871
Tajima Province
Domains of Hyōgo Prefecture